Francisco Miranda may refer to:

Francisco de Sá de Miranda, (1485-1558), Portuguese poet
Francisco de Miranda, (1750-1816), Spanish-American revolutionist
Francisco Miranda Concha, (1869-1950), Spanish trade union leader
Francisco Palacios Miranda, Governor and Military Commandant of the Baja California Territory 1844-1847
Francisco Miranda (footballer), Paraguayan footballer